Datana robusta, the annual buttonweed or robust datana moth, is a species of moth in the family Notodontidae (the prominents). It was first described by Herman Strecker in 1878 and it is found in North America.

The MONA or Hodges number for Datana robusta is 7909.

References

Further reading

 
 
 

Notodontidae
Articles created by Qbugbot
Moths described in 1878